Bantanto is a town in central Gambia. It is located in Niamina East District in the Central River Division.  As of 2008, it has an estimated population of 1,322.

References

External links
Satellite map at Maplandia

Populated places in the Gambia